Alviero Martini (born 1950) is an Italian fashion designer who was born in Cuneo and is known for the 1A Classe range of clothing and accessories, including watches, that is characterised by a "map" motif.

He is currently designing ALV (Andare Lontano Viaggiando) collections of handbags, apparel and accessories with a "passport stamps" motif.

Biography

Born in Cuneo (Piemonte) where he concludes his artistic studies, Martini started to travel exporting his handiwork: window setups. He explored different "worlds" by geography and environment, and at the age of 20 with a group of enthusiastic friends the set up a "theater company", although not professionally, followed by acting and costume designing. He worked with Italian actor Vittorio Gassman, on theater as well as movies and advertising.

With his background as a designer, illustrator, and fashion consultant, and after a few years in interior decoration, Martini was inspired by an antique map, found in a book store in Moscow, where he was working on 86/97. He brought the map back to Rome, where he was living at that time, and began thinking about how to transform it into a handbags collections. After two years of research, then a presentation to the USA press, that was decreed a success. He founded the company 1A Classe in 1991. In 2003, after having financial issues, he decided to partially sell the company to Group Final SpA; then, in 2006, he sold the outstanding part to the Group and left the brand.

Martini then created brand called ALV for Andare Lontano Viaggiando. ALV is an acronym of his name, but in the Italian language also means andare (going) lontano (far away), viaggiando (travelling). Surrounded by a circle with 5 weave lines, ALV becomes a postmark, sometimes knitted on jacquard or printed in laminated canvas, and the logo for new proposals for international and sophisticated travelers.

ALV is a women's ready to wear collection as well as accessories, high profile, completely fashion oriented, that Martini presented to international customers after three years of research. His showroom is located in Milan, in Piazza San Babila.

References

External links

Alviero Martini Logo History

People from Cuneo
Living people
Fashion designers from Milan
1950 births